The Cambridge Foundation School is situated on Narbal-Tangmarg Road, Waripora, Jammu and Kashmir. 

The nearest railway station is 8 km from it.

Schools in Srinagar